In information theory, the cross-entropy between two probability distributions  and  over the same underlying set of events measures the average number of bits needed to identify an event drawn from the set if a coding scheme used for the set is optimized for an estimated probability distribution , rather than the true distribution .

Definition 
The cross-entropy of the distribution   relative to a distribution  over a given set is defined as follows:

,

where  is the expected value operator with respect to the distribution . 

The situation for continuous distributions is analogous. Then

and therefore

Motivation 
Therefore, cross-entropy can be interpreted as the expected message-length per datum when a wrong distribution  is assumed while the data actually follows a distribution . That is why the expectation is taken over the true probability distribution  and not . Indeed the expected message-length under the true distribution  is

Estimation 
An example is language modeling, where a model is created based on a training set , and then its cross-entropy is measured on a test set to assess how accurate the model is in predicting the test data. Since the true distribution is unknown, cross-entropy cannot be directly calculated. In these cases, an estimate of cross-entropy is calculated using the following formula:

The sum is averaged over the  words of the test.

Relation to maximum likelihood 

In classification problems we want to estimate the probability of different outcomes.  Let the estimated probability of outcome  be  with to-be-optimized parameters  and let the frequency (empirical probability) of outcome  in the training set be .
Given N conditionally independent samples in the training set, then the likelihood of the parameters  of the model  on the training set is 

where the last expression is due to the definition of the multinomial PMF.

so that maximizing the likelihood with respect to the parameters  is the same as minimizing the cross-entropy.

Cross-entropy minimization 

Cross-entropy minimization is frequently used in optimization and rare-event probability estimation. In the engineering literature, the principle of minimizing KL divergence (Kullback's "Principle of Minimum Discrimination Information") is often called the Principle of Minimum Cross-Entropy (MCE), or Minxent.

In this case the two minimizations are not equivalent. In fact, cross-entropy is another name for relative entropy, see Cover and Thomas   and Good. On the other hand,  does not agree with the literature and can be misleading.

Cross-entropy loss function and logistic regression 
Cross-entropy can be used to define a loss function in machine learning and optimization. The true probability  is the true label, and the given distribution  is the predicted value of the current model. This is also known as the log loss (or logarithmic loss or logistic loss); the terms "log loss" and "cross-entropy loss" are used interchangeably.

More specifically, consider a binary regression model which can be used to classify observations into two possible classes (often simply labelled  and ). The output of the model for a given observation, given a vector of input features , can be interpreted as a probability, which serves as the basis for classifying the observation. In logistic regression, the probability is modeled using the logistic function  where  is some function of the input vector , commonly just a linear function. The probability of the output  is given by
 
where the vector of weights  is optimized through some appropriate algorithm such as gradient descent. Similarly, the complementary probability of finding the output  is simply given by
 

Logistic regression typically optimizes the log loss for all the observations on which it is trained, which is the same as optimizing the average cross-entropy in the sample. The average of the loss function is then given by:

 

where , with  the logistic function as before.

The logistic loss is sometimes called cross-entropy loss. It is also known as log loss (In this case, the binary label is often denoted by {−1,+1}).

Remark: The gradient of the cross-entropy loss for logistic regression is the same as the gradient of the squared error loss for linear regression. That is, define

 
 

Then we have the result 

 

The proof is as follows. For any , we have

 
 
 
 
 
 

In a similar way, we eventually obtain the desired result.

See also 
 Cross-entropy method
 Logistic regression
 Conditional entropy
 Maximum likelihood estimation
Mutual information

References

External links 
 Cross Entropy

Entropy and information
Loss functions